Stefan Brockhoff is a pseudonym that was used collectively by a group of three German co-authors of several detective novels, all of them having certain characteristics in common: they were all born in Germany at or about the beginning of the second decade of the twentieth century; at one point or another they all of them became refugees from Nazism; and they all eventually lived out their lives in the United States of America. Moreover, to every one of them the writing of detective novels was a youthful avocation, their principal interests and activities in later life lying in different areas.
 Dieter Cunz (1910–1969)
 Richard Plant (1910–1998)
 Oskar Seidlin (1911–1984)

References

Collective pseudonyms
Fictional German people
German male writers